Pierre Bourguignon (1630–1698) was a French Baroque painter.

Bourguignon was born in Namur.  He worked in Paris during the years 1671–1685 but moved north after the Edict of Nantes to the Hague where he became a member of the Confrerie Pictura in 1687.

Bourguignon died in London.

References

1630 births
1698 deaths
People from Namur (city)
French Baroque painters